Vincent Cassel (born 23 November 1966) is a French actor. He has starred in international and English language films and has earned a César Award and a Canadian Screen Award as well as nominations for a European Film Award and Screen Actors Guild Award.

He first achieved recognition for his performance as a troubled French Jewish youth in Mathieu Kassovitz's 1995 film La Haine (Hate) for which he received two César Award nominations. He also garnered attention for Gasper Noe's film Irréversible (2002) which he acted in and co-produced. He received the César Award for Best Actor for his role as the criminal Jacques Mesrine in Mesrine (2008). His other-Cèsar nominated roles include Read My Lips (2001), Mon Roi (2015), It's Only the End of the World (2016), and The Specials (2019).

He garnered recognition with English-speaking roles in Elizabeth (1998), Ocean's Twelve (2004) and Ocean's Thirteen (2007), as well as Eastern Promises (2007), Black Swan (2010), and Jason Bourne (2016). In 2020, he played Enguerrand Serac in the HBO series Westworld.

Early life and family
Cassel was born in Paris, France, to journalist Sabine Litique and actor Jean-Pierre Cassel (born Jean-Pierre Crochon). Cassel's brother, Mathias, is a rapper with the group Assassin under the name "Rockin' Squat". His half-sister, Cécile Cassel, is also an actor.

Career

Early work in France (1990s) 
One of Cassel's first on-screen appearances was a bit part in a 1994 Renault Clio advert which was used in the UK.

Cassel's breakthrough role was in Mathieu Kassovitz's critically acclaimed film La Haine (1995), in which he portrayed a troubled youth living in the deprived outskirts of Paris. For his role in La Haine, Cassel was nominated for two César Awards, for Best Actor and Most Promising Actor.

Throughout the 1990s and the early 2000s, Cassel performed in a string of French films. In 1996, he starred opposite Monica Bellucci (before they married) in the moody French film L'Appartement. The film was a critical success, winning a BAFTA Award for Best Film Not in the English Language and the first British Independent Film Award for the Best Film in a Foreign Language. The film was also a modest hit in France gaining 55,565 admissions its opening weekend and 152,714 admissions total. Although the film was never released theatrically in the United States, it was released on DVD on 22 August 2006.

In 1998, he portrayed Henry, Duc d'Anjou in Elizabeth. In 1999, he portrayed Gilles de Rais in Luc Besson's The Messenger: The Story of Joan of Arc. Other notable roles during this period of his career include the violent film Dobermann (1997), the genre-bending Brotherhood of the Wolf (2001), and the highly controversial Irréversible (2002), where he appears fully nude (with Monica Bellucci, after they married).

Transition into English films (2000s) 

Since the early 2000s, Cassel has also appeared in a number of English-language films, such as Shrek (as the voice of Monsieur Hood) and Birthday Girl (both 2001) Ocean's Twelve and Ocean's Thirteen (2004, 2007), and Derailed (2005). He has also dubbed the voice of Diego (Denis Leary) in the Ice Age franchise and Rodney Copperbottom (Ewan McGregor) in Robots.

In 2007, Cassel attracted significant critical acclaim for his performance in David Cronenberg's thriller film Eastern Promises, in which he starred opposite Viggo Mortensen and Naomi Watts. The film premiered on 8 September 2007 at the 2007 Toronto International Film Festival where it won the Audience Prize for best film on 15 September 2007. Film Journal International critic Doris Toumarkine dubbed Cassel's performance "particularly delicious". J. Hoberman of The Village Voice wrote that "Cassel literally flings himself into [his role]".

In October 2008, Cassel was signed to be the face of a new Yves Saint Laurent men's fragrance. The new fragrance, La Nuit de l'Homme, was launched worldwide in 2009. Cassel appeared in a two-part film about Jacques Mesrine, who was France's "public enemy number one" in the seventies. He won the César Award for Best Actor for his performance as Mesrine. Also that year, he starred in the Portuguese-language, Brazilian film Adrift (À Deriva), and made his debut as a singer on Zap Mama's album ReCreation, singing alongside them on the singles "Paroles, Paroles" and "Non, Non, Non".

Later work (2010s) 
The following year, in 2010, Cassel played Thomas Leroy in Darren Aronofsky's critically acclaimed Black Swan (2010), alongside Natalie Portman and Mila Kunis, which attracted considerable acclaim. For his performance in Black Swan, he was nominated alongside his cast for the Screen Actors Guild Award for Outstanding Performance by a Cast in a Motion Picture.

In 2011, Cassel played the lead role in the French-Spanish thriller-drama film The Monk, directed by Dominik Moll. Screen Daily praised his performance, writing that "Cassel exudes otherworldly gravitas and his singular looks are perfect for the role." That year, he also starred in the German-Canadian historical film A Dangerous Method, directed by David Cronenberg; in the latter, he starred opposite Keira Knightley, Michael Fassbender, and Mortensen (marking their second film together). The film premiered at the 68th Venice Film Festival and was also featured at the 2011 Toronto International Film Festival.

In 2014, he portrayed The Beast opposite Léa Seydoux as Belle in the French-language adaptation of Beauty and the Beast. The film was screened out of competition at the 64th Berlin International Film Festival. It was released in France on in February 2014 to positive reviews, becoming a box office success. In Japan, the film topped the box office on its release, making it the first non-English-language foreign film to top the Japanese box office since Red Cliff II in 2009, and the first French film to top the Japanese box office since Mathieu Kassovitz's The Crimson Rivers in 2001.

In 2016, Cassel was featured in American action thriller film Jason Bourne, directed by Paul Greengrass; the film is the fifth installment of the Bourne film series and a direct sequel to The Bourne Ultimatum (2007). Despite mixed reviews, the film was a box office success, grossing more than $400 million worldwide. That year, he also attracted critical acclaim for his performance as Antoine in Xavier Dolan's It's Only the End of the World, which premiered at the Cannes Film Festival. For his work in the film, Cassel won the Canadian Screen Award for Best Supporting Actor; he also received nominations for the César Award for Best Supporting Actor, the Globes de Cristal Award for Best Actor, and the Jury Prize for Best Actor at the Riviera International Film Festival.

In 2019, Cassel played the lead role in The Specials directed by  Olivier Nakache and Éric Toledano based on the true story of Stephane Benhamou who ran an organization helping people with Autism find employment and activities outside the confines of the institutionalized setting. It was screened out of competition at the 2019 Cannes Film Festival and Cassel was nominated for the  César Award for Best Actor.

Recent work (2020s) 
In 2020, he portrayed trillionaire Engerraund Serac, the main antagonist of the third season of the HBO series Westworld.

In 2021, he narrated the documentary Reset, directed by Thierry Donard.

In 2023, he starred in the Apple TV+ spy thriller series "Liaison" with Eva Green

Personal life

Cassel met Italian actress Monica Bellucci on the set of their 1996 film The Apartment. They married on 2 August 1999 in Monaco. They have two daughters, Deva (born 12 September 2004) and Léonie (born 21 May 2010). Cassel and Bellucci announced their separation on 26 August 2013. Bellucci filed for divorce the same year. They later divorced. At the age of 15, Deva was Dolce & Gabbana's muse to embody their Dolce Shine perfume and later became their runway model.

He married 21-year-old French model  on 24 August 2018 in Bidart, France, after being in a relationship for more than two years. They have a daughter, Amazonie (born 19 April 2019).

Besides his native French, Cassel speaks English, Portuguese, Italian, and basic conversational Russian, which he learned for his role in Eastern Promises. Cassel lived in Rio de Janeiro for five years, before moving back to Paris in 2018, and he used to have Brazilian citizenship. Cassel is known for having a great identification with Brazil, being a practitioner of the martial art of capoeira; he displayed this talent in the movie Ocean's Twelve.

Cassel went to different schools, including a Catholic school, eventually becoming irreligious. He opened up about his religious views in an interview, saying: "I’m totally secular myself, and I have a tremendous respect for life. Which means that I essentially believe in God in a certain sense, but I'm not a Catholic or Jewish or Muslim. I'm without a religion."

His father, Jean-Pierre Cassel, died of cancer on 19 April 2007 at age 74.

Filmography

Live-action

Animated

References

External links

 Vincent Cassel's Films at subtitledonline.com
 
 CNN interview with Vincent Cassel

1966 births
20th-century French male actors
21st-century French male actors
Best Actor César Award winners
Best Actor Lumières Award winners
Best Supporting Actor Genie and Canadian Screen Award winners
French capoeira practitioners
French film producers
French male film actors
French male voice actors
French expatriates in Brazil
French expatriates in Spain
French Wing Chun practitioners
Knights of the Ordre national du Mérite
Living people
Male actors from Paris